Ağırnas is a township with its own municipality in Central Anatolia, Asian Turkey. It is also within the boundaries of the Kayseri metropolitan area, and administratively in Kayseri's metropolitan municipality of Melikgazi, although it retains its distinct character. 

History
Ağırnas is the birthplace of Mimar Sinan, the architect who worked under Suleiman the Magnificent, and is a site rich in historic buildings. One recently restored house is associated with Sinan himself.

Underground city
Although they remain far from having been explored in full, the town appears to extend for quite a length below the ground as well, which is not uncommon for Cappadocia and Ağırnas may well be sharing the characteristics and become the next in line to neighboring underground localities such as Derinkuyu and Kaymaklı Underground City. Caves and subterranean vaults and passages, complete in chapels, dining rooms, cells and perhaps even dungeons and torture rooms, are for the moment partially open to public with Sinan house's cellar as departure point.

See also

Kayseri
Populated places in Kayseri Province
Towns in Turkey
Underground cities in Cappadocia
Archaeological sites in Central Anatolia